OBORO is an artist-run centre in Montréal created in 1982 by Daniel Dion and Su Schnee.

History 

For its first 10 years, OBORO was located on Saint-Laurent Boulevard in Montreal. In 1992, OBORO moved to its current premises on Berri Street.

In 1995, OBORO launched its New Media Lab. The Lab is a space devoted to new technologies, electronic media and telecommunications. In 2001, the Lab expanded and moved to the 2nd floor of the building.

Curator Dominique Fontaine notes that OBORO "plays a central role in Montreal's media art ecology.".

OBORO celebrated its 25th anniversary in 2009, and in the same year was recognized with distinction from The Conseil des arts de Montréal.

Mandate 

OBORO supports local, national and international artistic practices. The Centre organizes 5 to 10 major exhibitions each year, in addition to hosting training courses, residencies and conferences. OBORO's mandate stresses that the exchange of artistic ideas can lead to a more peaceful world. As the centre's mission statement notes: "OBORO’s objective is to promote awareness and dialogue within the art world and society at large and to contribute to a culture of peace."

References 

Arts centres